Fátima Montaño Rentería (born 2 October 1984) is a Colombian footballer who plays as a left back. She has been a member of the Colombia women's national team.

Club career
Montaño played for CD Águila.

International career
Montaño played for Colombia at senior level in the 2011 FIFA Women's World Cup and the 2014 Copa América Femenina.

References

External links
 

1984 births
Living people
Women's association football fullbacks
Colombian women's footballers
Sportspeople from Valle del Cauca Department
Colombia women's international footballers
2011 FIFA Women's World Cup players
Pan American Games competitors for Colombia
Footballers at the 2011 Pan American Games